Paul Matthew Cram (born October 31, 1985) is an American actor. He is known for his role as "Zee", in the film Intermedio.

Filmography 
 Sugar & Spice (2001) - as Fickle Video Renter (uncredited) 
Intermedio (2005) - as Zee
Chiseled (2006) - as Charlie
(Yielding to) A Willing Breath (2006) - as Bryan
13 Hours in a Warehouse (2008) - as Craig Teller
Contract Killers (2008) - as Chuck Dittmer
Peacock (2010) - as Kenny

Paul hails from a sprawling west coast family of 15. His interest in art is an oddity for his family because of his father's military career, five of his brother's military background, & two sisters working on the police force, as well as his family's legacy of making maps.

External links

1985 births
Living people
People from Augusta, Maine